= Masters M75 triple jump world record progression =

This is the progression of world record improvements of the triple jump M75 division of Masters athletics.

Key

Incomplete information Pending

Distance	Wind	Athlete	Nationality	Birthdate	Location	Date
10.10	-0.6	Lothar Fischer	Germany	15.03.1936	Minden	29.07.2011
10.05		Mazumi Morita	Japan	17.07.1913	Akita	31.07.1988
